Sassoon as a name may refer to:

Surname
Sassoon family, a Jewish business family originating in Baghdad, Iraq, including:
 Saleh Sassoon (1750–1830)
 David Sassoon (David Ben Sassoon) (1792–1864), married: 1) Hannah Joseph, daughter of Abdullah Joseph 2) Flora (Farha) Hayim, daughter of Freddy Faraj Hayim (Furraj Hyeem) and Rifka Elkebir Gubbay (daughter of Heskel Elkebir Gubbay (1740–1816) and Ades Elkebir Gubbay, sister of Shoua Heskel Elkebir (see below)), in 1828
 Sir Albert Abdullah David Sassoon (1818–1896), 1st Baronet of Kensington Gore, married Hannah Moses, daughter of Meyer Moses.
 Aziza Abraham Sassoon, married Ezekiel Abraham (Heskel Shoua Heskel Elkebir) (1824–1896) (son of Shoua Heskel Elkebir (see above) and Mazaltov (Muzli Toba) Somekh)
 Flora (Farha) Abraham (1856–1936), married Solomon David Sassoon (1841–1894) (see below)
 Rachel Gubbay
 Joseph Albert Sassoon
 Mozelle Ezra
 Sir Edward Sassoon (1856–1912), 2nd Baronet of Kensington Gore, married Aline Caroline de Rothschild, daughter of Gustave de Rothschild and Cécile Anspach, in 1887.
 Sir Philip Sassoon (1888–1939), 3rd Baronet of Kensington Gore
 Sybil Cholmondeley, Marchioness of Cholmondeley (1894–1989), she married George Cholmondeley, 5th Marquess of Cholmondeley
 Elias David Sassoon (1820–1880), businessman
 Jacob Elias Sassoon (1844–1916), first Baronet, married Mary Sheung Mei Zimmern
 Hannah David
 Sir Edward Elias Sassoon (1853–1924), 2nd Baronet of Bombay
 Lydia Weisweiller
 Hector Sassoon
 Sir Victor Sassoon (Ellice) (1881–1961), 3rd Baronet
 Isabelle Rosalind Humphreys-Owen
 Charles Sassoon (1847–?)
 Joseph Sassoon (1851–1868)
 Meyer Sassoon (1855–1924)
 Rachel Solomon (1858–1881)
 Sarah Sassoon (1861–?)
 Aziza Abraham
 David Sasoon
 Cesar Sassoon
 Amam Moses
 Mazaltob Sassoon
 Sassoon David Sassoon (1832–1867), British Indian merchant, married Flora (Fahra) Reuben (1837–1919)
 Joseph Sassoon Sassoon (1855–1918), married Baroness Louise de Gunzburg (1862–1921)
 Captain Sassoon Joseph Sassoon (1885–1922), married Dulcie Franklin, daughter of Frederic Samuel Franklin and Lucy Amy Magnus, on 12 March 1919.
 Penelope Louise Sassoon (b. 1920), married 1) F/Lt. Michael Ingoldsby Massy, son of Major William Ingoldsby Justice Massy and Adam Mary Frances Simpson, on 18 May 1944 2) Serge Horace de Genzburg, son of Baron Vladimir de Genzburg, on 8 September 1948.
 Major Arthur Meyer Sassoon (b. 1889), married Doris Meyer.
 Hugh Meyer Sassoon (b. 1929), married Marion Julia Schiff.
 James Sassoon (born 1955), British businessman and government minister, married Sarah Caroline Ray Barnes, daughter of Sir Ernest John Ward Barnes, in 1981.
 Major Frederick Sassoon (b. 1892), married Margaret Lucy Franklin, daughter of Frederic Samuel Franklin and Lucy Amy Magnus, on 27 March 1919.
 Dr. Humphrey Frederick Sassoon (b. 1920), married Mary Patricia Boord, daughter of Captain Sydney John Savage Boord and Mary Ethel Margaret Copeman, on 8 June 1956.
 Timothy John Frederick Sassoon (b. 1957)
 Mark Richard Humphrey Sassoon (b. 1959)
 Clare Penelope Mary Sassoon (b. 1961)
 Rachel Beer (April 7, 1858)
 Alfred Ezra Sassoon (1861–1895), married Theresa Georgina Thornycroft, daughter of Thomas Thornycroft and Mary Francis, in 1882.
 Siegfried Sassoon (1886–1967), poet, especially on the subject of World War I, married Hester Gatty in 1933.
 George Sassoon (1936–2006), English scientist, electronic engineer, linguist, translator and author, married: 1) Stephanie Munro in 1955 2) Marguerite Dicks in 1961 3) Susan Christian-Howard in 1975 4) Alison Pulvertaft.
 Kendall Sassoon
 Isobel Hannah Sassoon (1976–1996)
 Thomas Thornycroft Sassoon (1978–1996)
 Michael Thornycroft Sassoon (1884–1969)
 Alfred Lionel "Léo" Sassoon
 Norman Basil Arundel "Patrick" Sassoon
 Hamo Sassoon (1920–2004), married Flavia Sybil Adeva Kingscote (1911–1946), daughter of Lt.-Col. Randolph Albert Fitzhardinge Kingscote and Elizabeth Butler, on 12 January 1946.
 2nd Lt. Hamo Watts Sassoon (1887–1915)
 Frederick Meyer Sassoon
 Reuben David Sassoon (1835–1905), married Catherine Sassoon (1838–1906).
 Mozelle Sassoon
 Louise Judith Sassoon (1874–1964), married Sir Charles Cavendish Boyle, son of Cavendish Spencer Boyle and Rose Susan Alexander, on 9 July 1914.
 Arthur Sassoon (1840–1912), married  (Eugenie) Louise (Perugia) Sassoon (1854–1943), daughter of Signor Achille Perugia of Trieste, Italy, whose sister Marie Perugia (1862–1937) was married to Leopold de Rothschild (1845–1917)
 Solomon David Sassoon (1841–1894), married Flora Gubbay (1859–1936), daughter of Ezekiel Abraham Gubbay (1824–1896) and Aziza Sassoon (1839–1897)
 Lady Rachel Ezra (1877–1952), married David Ezra
 Mozelle Sassoon (1884–1921)
 David Suleiman Sassoon (1880–1942) married Selina Sophie Prins, a granddaughter of Eliezer Liepman Philip Prins
 Flora Farcha Farha Feuchtwanger
 Rabbi Solomon David Sassoon (1915–1985), Talmudic scholar and writer
 Rabbi Isaac S.D. Sassoon, Sephardic Orthodox rabbi
 Aaron Sassoon (1841–1907)
 Catherine "Kate" Ezekiel Sassoon (1844–1917)
 Rebecca Sassoon Shellim (1847–1918)
 Simha Sassoon (1850–1857)
 Frederick David Sassoon (1853–1917), married the daughter of Edward L. Raphael.
 Ronald Edward David Sassoon
 Mozelle Sassoon Hayeem (1855–1952)
 David Sassoon

Not part of the above family tree:
 Kathryn Harrison (born 1961), American writer, descended from the Sassoon family via her grandmother
 Rosemary Sassoon (born 1931), creator of the Sassoon series of typefaces
 Vidal Sassoon (1928–2012), English hairdresser and businessman
 Catya Sassoon (1968–2002), American actress
 David Sassoon (designer) (born 1932)

Given name
Sassoon David Sassoon (1832–1867), British Indian merchant (see surname section above)
Sassoon Eskell (1860–1932), Iraqi statesman and financier regarded in Iraq as the Father of Parliament
Sir Sassoon David, 1st Baronet (1849–1926), Iraqi-born Indian businessman and statesman

See also
Sassoon (disambiguation)

References